Chris Madden may refer to:
 Chris Madden (ice hockey)
 Chris Madden (designer)